Ypthima jacksoni, or Jackson's ringlet, is a butterfly in the family Nymphalidae. It is found in Ethiopia, Somalia, and along the coast of Kenya. The habitat consists of moist and dry savanna.

References

jack
Butterflies of Africa
Butterflies described in 1982